Dame Eva Turner,  (10 March 1892 – 16 June 1990) was an English dramatic soprano with an international reputation. Her strong, steady and well-trained voice was renowned for its clarion power in Italian and German operatic roles.

Career
Eva Turner was born in Werneth, Oldham. Her first formal singing lessons were with Dan Rootham, who taught voice to contralto (later Dame) Clara Butt. From 1911-14, Turner studied at the Royal Academy of Music in London. She was later made a Fellow of the Royal Academy of Music (FRAM) in 1928.

She began her career as a chorister with the Carl Rosa Opera Company and steadily took on larger roles such as Kate Pinkerton and the lead role of Cio Cio San in Madama Butterfly, Micaela in Carmen, Musetta in Puccini's La bohème, Santuzza in Cavalleria rusticana, Donna Anna in Don Giovanni, Elisabeth in Tannhäuser, Freia in Das Rheingold, Elsa in Lohengrin, Brünnhilde in Der Ring des Nibelungen, Leonora in La forza del destino, Leonora in Fidelio, Eva in Die Meistersinger, and the title roles in Aida, Tosca (in one performance of which the famous incident with a trampoline occurred) and Thaïs.

In 1924, after an audition for the La Scala company in Milan, she was engaged by its principal conductor Arturo Toscanini as Freia and Sieglinde for the La Scala Ring Cycle of 1924–25.

She also played the title role in Turandot. She was in the audience for the April 1926 premiere at La Scala and first sang it in December that year at the Teatro Grande in Brescia. In 1928, she performed it at the Covent Garden (also playing Aida and Santuzza during the season), and in 1929, she took the part at La Scala. Recordings of her Turandot recorded live at Covent Garden in 1937 with Giovanni Martinelli as Calaf and John Barbirolli conducting remained unissued at the time but were released on EMI CD CDH 7610742 in the 1980s.

When Ralph Vaughan Williams composed his Serenade to Music for 16 leading singers of the day, he included lines for Eva Turner but separated them from those for the other three sopranos. A 1938 recording of the work, conducted by Sir Henry Wood and made immediately after the premiere, captures Turner's voice in the lines Vaughan Williams wrote for her [this was issued by Columbia on 2 12" 78 rpm discs, LX 757/58, and later re-issued on a 7" microgroove disc, SED 5553. It is now on CD from Dutton Vocalion. She retired from the concert stage in 1948.

Tuition
After retiring from the stage, she remained active in the industry, the following year, she was offered the position of visiting professor of voice at the University of Oklahoma, and a one-year contract was extended for nine years. She derived amusement from a misprint in a local newspaper which described her as "Professor of Vice", especially as she was later to say that she was "not in demand" except as a singer.

She returned to London in 1959 where she was appointed Professor of Singing at the Royal Academy of Music, a position she held until aged well into her 80s. Her style of teaching was too forthright for some (Rita Hunter found it too demanding), but it produced such successful students as Amy Shuard, Roberta Knie, Janet Coster and Dame Kiri Te Kanawa. Shuard and later Dame Gwyneth Jones, both of whom had success in the role of Turandot, studied this part with her.

Honours
She was the subject of This Is Your Life on two occasions: in September 1959 when she was surprised by Eamonn Andrews at the BBC Television Theatre, and in February 1983, when Andrews surprised her shortly before her 91st birthday at the Royal Opera House.

In retirement, she was closely involved with the International Association of Wagner Societies in the UK and elsewhere. Unlike some retired singers she enjoyed attending performances and she was frequently present in the audience at Covent Garden, up to the time of her death. Evidencing a genial sense of humour about her craft, she was a regular patron of Hinge and Bracket concert and gala performances, often seen enjoying their affectionate tribute to the operatic and performance style of an earlier age.

She was appointed a Dame Commander of the Order of the British Empire (DBE) in 1962. Most of her recordings from the 1920s and 1930s are now available on CD reissues.

She was made a Fellow of the Royal College of Music (FRCM) in 1974 and a Fellow of the Royal Northern College of Music (FRNCM) in 1978.

She was awarded the Freedom of the Borough of Oldham on 7 July 1982. In the same year she was made an Honorary Citizen of the State of Oklahoma.

References

Sources
 The Last Prima Donnas, by Lanfranco Rasponi, Alfred A Knopf, 1982. 
 "A Life on the High C's" by Linda Esther Gray 2011 
A View From Primrose Hill: The Memoirs of Caroline Ramsden, Hutchinson Benham, London Melbourne Sydney Auckland Johannesburg, 1984;

External links
 Biography: Dame Eva Turner
 Dame Eva Turner 
 Interview with Dame Eva Turner, 30 April 1986

1892 births
1990 deaths
People educated at Bedford High School, Bedfordshire
Alumni of the Royal Academy of Music
Academics of the Royal Academy of Music
Fellows of the Royal Academy of Music
Dames Commander of the Order of the British Empire
Singers awarded knighthoods
English operatic sopranos
People from Oldham
University of Oklahoma faculty
Musicians from Lancashire
20th-century British women opera singers
Women music educators